The 1966 Army Cadets football team represented the United States Military Academy in the 1966 NCAA University Division football season. In their first year under head coach Tom Cahill, the Cadets compiled an 8–2 record and outscored their opponents by a combined total of 141 to 105.  In the annual Army–Navy Game, the Cadets defeated the Midshipmen by a 20 to 7 score. The Cadets lost only to Notre Dame by a 35 to 0 score and to Tennessee by a 38 to 7 score. 
 
Army linebacker Townsend Clarke was selected by the Central Press Association as a first-team player on the 1966 College Football All-America Team. Tom Cahill was voted Coach of the Year by his fellow coaches and the football writers.

Schedule

Personnel

Season summary

Penn State
Rain

George Washington
Charlie Jarvis 104 Rush Yds

at California

vs Navy

Awards/honors
Tom Cahill – "Coach of the Year" by American Football Coaches, Football Writers and Touchdown Club of Washington, D.C.

External links

References

Army
Army Black Knights football seasons
Army Cadets football